Benichandra Jamatia (1930 – 14 December 2020) was a Tripuri Indian folk writer and litterateur, known for his contribution to the fields of literature, songs and education in Tripura. He is credited with introducing the baul singing tradition of West Bengal in Kokborok language for the first time. In 2020, he was awarded the Padma Shri (2020), the fourth-highest civilian award in India. He died at his home on 14 December 2020.

Biography
Benichandra Jamatia was born to Padasingh Jamatia and Suchitra in Maharani, Gomati District, Tripura. While he was young, his mother narrated the Puranas stories to him in the Kokborok tongue. His days were taken up by farming and cattle rearing.

He was married to Durgamati Jamatia and has nine children.

Jamatia died on 14 December 2020

Awards
 Padma Shri 2020

See also

 List of Padma Shri award recipients (2020–2029)

References

1930 births
2020 deaths
Tripuri people
People from Tripura
Recipients of the Padma Shri in literature & education
People from Gomati district
Kokborok-language writers
20th-century Indian writers
20th-century Indian male writers

Kokborok playback singers